Netani Sukanaivalu is a Fijian academic, former naval officer, and political leader, who was appointed to the interim Cabinet as Minister for Education on 9 January 2006.

A former lecturer at the Fiji Institute of Technology, Sukanaivalu is businessman, and a reserve officer in the Fijian Navy holding the rank of lieutenant commander. He was an unsuccessful candidate for the National Alliance Party in the 2006 parliamentary election.

He was Fiji's Minister for Lands and Mineral Resources in the Military-backed interim government which followed the military coup of 2006, but resigned from Fiji Government February 2011

QUALIFICATIONS		:	Master of Science Degree – Sweden
					Incorporate Engineer – Engineering Council, UK
					Associate Member, Institute of Marine Engineers, UK
					Class 1 Engineer (Foreign Going) – Australia
					Full Trade Certificates
					Technical Teachers’ Certificate

TERTIARY INSTITUTION:	World Maritime University – Sweden
ATTENDED				Sydney Institute of Technology – Australia
					Fiji Institute of Technology – Fiji

References

Living people
Fijian Navy officers
Year of birth missing (living people)
Government ministers of Fiji
I-Taukei Fijian people
Fijian scientists
Academic staff of Fiji Institute of Technology
Fijian businesspeople
National Alliance Party of Fiji politicians